Events from the year 2012 in Sweden

Incumbents

National level
 Monarch - Carl XVI Gustaf
 Prime Minister - Fredrik Reinfeldt

Events

Births
 23 February – Princess Estelle, Duchess of Östergötland

Deaths

 19 January – Peter Åslin, ice hockey goaltender (b. 1962).
 5 May – Carl Johan Bernadotte, prince (b. 1916).
 22 June – Hans Villius, historian and author (b. 1923).
 14 July – Sixten Jernberg, cross country skier (b. 1929).
 12 November – Hans Hammarskiöld, photographer (b. 1925).
 25 November – Lars Hörmander, mathematician (b. 1931).

See also
2012 in Swedish television

References

 
Years of the 21st century in Sweden